Gug Tappeh, also rendered as Gog Tappeh and Geog Tappeh, may refer to various places in Iran:
 Gug Tappeh, Ardabil
 Gug Tappeh, Hamadan
 Gug Tappeh, Kurdistan
 Gug Tappeh, Marivan, Kurdistan Province
 Gug Tappeh, Bukan, West Azerbaijan Province
 Gug Tappeh, Mahabad, West Azerbaijan Province
 Gug Tappeh, Urmia, West Azerbaijan Province
 Gug Tappeh-ye Khaleseh, West Azerbaijan Province
 Gug Tappeh-ye Laleh, West Azerbaijan Province
 Gug Tappeh, Zanjan
 Gug Tappeh Rural District, in Ardabil Province

See also
 Guk Tappeh (disambiguation), various places in Iran
 Göytəpə (disambiguation)